Hechen is a town located in the east of Xinghua City in east-central Jiangsu province. The area has approximately 60,000 inhabitants spread over 16,200 households. The town is an old revolutionary base, and was the location of many well-known battles. The flat terrain, fertile soil, spaced water network, superior ecological environment and rich natural resources have made the town relatively prosperous.

Agriculture 
Xinghua is a national grain county, and Hechen is the “granary” of Xinghua city. In Hechen, people focus on planting rice, wheat, oilseed and cotton. It is also riched in fish and poultry, such as rabbits, chickens, ducks, geese, pigs and sheep. Approximately 400,000 poultry are produced annually, and about 150,000 pigs.

Industrial development 
In recent years, Hechen has planned to establish 2000 acres of industrial parks in the town and has developed a number of preferential policies to create a favorable investment environment and attract a group of investors from Shanghai, Zhejiang and Yancheng. The aim is to strengthen investment and the development of industrial economy while still paying attention to agricultural production. The town's industrial economy has increased at a 40% rate.

Administrative divisions
There is one residential community and 27 villages under the town's administration:

Residential community: Minjian (民建社区)

Villages:

Transport 
There are many methods of transport to and from Hechen, including the Tongyu Canal, the Chuanchang river, the 204 State Road, the Yan Jing Ning Expressway and the nearby Xinghua railway station.

References
 Xinghua Government
 Tenwang

External links
 Government website (Chinese)

Township-level divisions of Jiangsu